This is a list of Ministers of Institutional Relations and Participation of Catalonia
 Joan Saura (ICV) 2003-2006

Lists of government ministers of Catalonia